Nioro du Rip   is a city in the south-west of Sénégal, situated about  to the south-west of Kaolack and is  from the border with The Gambia.

History
The town of Nioro du Rip was the capital of Rip (a kingdom of the marabout leader Maba Diakhou Bâ). Cheikh Ahmadou Bamba Mbacké (founder of The Mouride brotherhood) at one point lived here. Nioro is near one group of the Senegambian stone circles which date from the eighth century.

Administration
The town is the capital of Nioro du Rip Department, in région of Kaolack.

Geography
Nioro du Rip is on the route nationale N4 which links Kaolack to Ziguinchor via The Gambia.
The nearest small towns are Keur Ali Gueye, Paoskoto, Diamaguene, Keur Bidji Ouri, Lougue, Bamba, Bakesaloum, Mbaye Faye Fafa et Mbap.

Bibliography
 (English) Ba-Curry, Ginette. In Search of Maba: A 19th Century Epic from Senegambia, West Africa (Preface of the Play by Edris Makward, Emeritus Professor of African Literature, Univ of Wisconsin, USA), Phoenix Press International, Maryland, 2011 [Category: Drama].[1]
 Alioune Touré, La population de Nioro du Rip, du protectorat français (1887) à la veille de la Seconde Guerre mondiale, Université de Dakar, 1987, 6 + 96 p. (Mémoire de Maîtrise)

External links
 Maps, weather and airports for Nioro du Rip
Nioro du RIP en photos
Detailed map of Region
Government links and services for Nioro du Rip
Initiative for the development of Nioro du Rip
Nioro du Rip Guide

Populated places in Kaolack Region
Kaolack Region
Communes of Senegal